The 2016–17 Alaska Anchorage Seawolves men's ice hockey season was the 38th season of play for the program, the 35th at the Division I level and the 24th in the WCHA conference. The Seawolves represented the University of Alaska Anchorage and were coached by Matt Thomas, in his 4th season.

Season
After two subpar years, Alaska Anchorage was hoping to get back into the playoff picture. Unfortunately, the team got off to a dreadful start; the Seawolves won just one of their first 14 games and found themselves at the bottom of the WCHA. The team's outlook began to brighten in December when they won games in three separate weekends, including against ranked Bemidji State.

Alaska Anchorage continued to show improvement in the second half of the season, playing .500 hockey for two and a half months. After taking four points in their series against Lake Superior State, the Seawolves were just 5 points out of a playoff spot with four games to play. Their offense, however, failed down the stretch and the team was swept by Ferris State. With only two games against arch-rival Alaska remaining, the Seawolves had to win both games to have any chance at extending their season. When the Nanooks won the first match, it ended any postseason hopes for Anchorage and a second defeat gave UAF their 8th consecutive Governor's Cup.

Departures

Recruiting

Roster

Standings

Schedule and results

|-
!colspan=12 style=";" | Exhibition

|-
!colspan=12 style=";" | Regular Season

|-
!colspan=12 style=";" |

Scoring statistics

Goaltending statistics

Rankings

USCHO did not release a poll in Week 24.

References

Alaska Anchorage Seawolves men's ice hockey seasons
Alaska Anchorage Seawolves
Alaska Anchorage Seawolves
2017 in sports in Alaska
2016 in sports in Alaska